Tala railway station is a Kolkata Suburban Railway station in Shyambazar, Kolkata. It serves the local areas of Shyambazar and Belgachia in the Kolkata, West Bengal, India. Only a few local trains halt here. The station has two platforms, and is mainly a freight yard. Its station code is TALA.

Station

Complex 
The platform is not very well sheltered. The station lacks many facilities including water and sanitation. It is connected to the Jessore Road. There is no proper approach road to this station.

Layout

Connections

Bus 
Bus route number 3, 3B, 3C/1, 3C/2, 3D, 3D/1, 30A, 30B, 30B/1, 30C, 30D, 32A, 34B, 34C, 43/1, 47B, 78, 78/1, 79B, 91, 91A, 93, 201, 202, 211A, 214, 214A, 215/1, 219, 219/1, 222, 227, 230, 234, 234/1, 237/1, DN18, KB16, KB22, K1, K4, JM2, JM4, 007, 7 (Mini), S158 (Mini), S159 (Mini), S160 (Mini), S161 (Mini), S164 (Mini), S168 (Mini), S180 (Mini), S181 (Mini), S185 (Mini), S189 (Mini), C11, C45, C50, D4/1, D11, D23, E14, E19D, E32, E51, EB1, EB1A, M34, MX1, MX2, MX3, S9A, S10, S11, S12C, S15G, S21, S32, S32A, S45, S56, S57, S58, T8, 11A, 33, AC2B, AC17B, AC20, AC35, AC40, AC54 serve the station.

Metro 
Shyambazar metro station and Belgachia metro station are located nearby.

Air

External links

References 

Sealdah railway division
Railway stations in Kolkata
Transport in Kolkata
Kolkata Suburban Railway stations
Kolkata Circular Railway